William Scott Mitchell (born January 2, 1968) is a former professional American football player who was a quarterback in the National Football League (NFL) for 12 seasons. He played for the Miami Dolphins, Detroit Lions, Baltimore Ravens and Cincinnati Bengals of the NFL, and also the Orlando Thunder of the World League of American Football. Mitchell played college football for the University of Utah.

College career
Mitchell played for the Utah Utes.

Statistics

Professional career
Mitchell was selected by the Miami Dolphins in the fourth round (93rd overall) of the 1990 NFL Draft. After serving three years as Dan Marino's back-up, Mitchell became the Dolphins' starting quarterback for the remainder of the 1993 season when Marino was injured in week 6 at Cleveland; the team would miss the playoffs that season.

Mitchell was signed as a free agent by the Detroit Lions in 1994.
Mitchell led a Detroit offense that included running back Barry Sanders and receivers Herman Moore and Brett Perriman. However, in 1994—his first season as a starter for the Lions—Mitchell struggled. In a loss to the Green Bay Packers, Mitchell went down with an injury, and was replaced by backup quarterback Dave Krieg, who led the team to the 1994 playoffs. Offensive tackle Lomas Brown, on ESPN program First Take later admitted to purposefully missing a block that resulted in this injury, as he was upset over Mitchell's poor play. However, a review of game film and play-by-play logs of the game by football historian Andy Barall fails to corroborate Brown's recollection of what occurred. Mitchell regained his starting position the following year.

In 1995, he set single-season records for the Lions in touchdown passes (32) and passing yards (4,338), both of which were later eclipsed by Matthew Stafford. Mitchell's Lions made the NFL playoffs in 1995 and 1997. Mitchell stayed with the Lions through the 1998 season, when he lost the starting quarterback job to rookie Charlie Batch. 

Made expendable after the Lions signed Gus Frerotte two weeks earlier, Mitchell was dealt to the Baltimore Ravens on March 16, 1999 for a third-round draft pick that year and a fifth-rounder in 2000. After not being able to acquire Brad Johnson from the Minnesota Vikings, the Ravens settled for Mitchell who signed a one-year $3 million contract upon his arrival in Baltimore. He completed 24 of 56 passes for 236 yards, threw a touchdown pass and was intercepted four times before Stoney Case replaced him as starting quarterback during the third quarter of a 23–20 loss to the Pittsburgh Steelers in a Week 2 home opener at PSINet Stadium on September 19. He saw no further action with the Ravens and became an unrestricted free agent following the 1999 season.

Mitchell signed with the Cincinnati Bengals on March 9, 2000. He was the veteran backup to Akili Smith after Jeff Blake signed as a free agent with the New Orleans Saints. He retired as an active player following the 2001 season.

NFL career statistics

Coaching career
In February 2008, Mitchell was announced as the head football coach of his alma mater, Springville High School in Utah. He stepped down from his coaching position in January 2012 to spend more time on his software business.

Personal life
In 2014, Mitchell had reached . He was a contestant on Season 16 of the reality competition The Biggest Loser, titled The Biggest Loser: Glory Days, which premiered on September 11, 2014 on NBC.  He was eliminated in week 15 as the last player eliminated from "comeback canyon", losing his final weigh in to Howard "Woody" Carter. Mitchell is an Eagle Scout.

See also
 List of NCAA major college football yearly passing leaders
 List of NCAA major college football yearly total offense leaders
 List of left-handed quarterbacks

References

1968 births
Living people
American football quarterbacks
Baltimore Ravens players
Cincinnati Bengals players
Detroit Lions players
Miami Dolphins players
Orlando Thunder players
Utah Utes football players
High school football coaches in Utah
People from Springville, Utah
Players of American football from Salt Lake City
Coaches of American football from Utah